Gregory Hills is a suburb of Sydney in the state of New South Wales, Australia in Camden Council. The suburb was assigned on 1 August 2008. The suburb was named from the topography of the local area and from the original St Gregory's Chapel on the Marist Brothers land.

Population
According to the 2016 census of Population, there were 4,985 people in Gregory Hills.
 Aboriginal and Torres Strait Islander people made up 2.2% of the population. 
 69.5% of people were born in Australia. The next most common countries of birth were Fiji 2.8% and India 2.1%.   
 67.9% of people only spoke English at home. Other languages spoken at home included Hindi 3.7%, Arabic 2.4% and Spanish 2.3%. 
 The most common responses for religion were Catholic 38.8%, No Religion 16.0% and Anglican 13.7%.

References

Suburbs of Sydney
Towns in the Macarthur (New South Wales)
Camden Council (New South Wales)